Hye-rim Park (born January 17, 1985) is a Korean-American model. Park made her runway debut during the Fall/Winter 2005 season.

Career
Her big break came in early 2005, when Steven Meisel shot her for Italian Vogue prior to the fall 2005 shows. After the shoot, she went to walk for major shows including Marc Jacobs and Anna Sui in New York. Her real big break, however, came when Miuccia Prada and Russell Marsh cast her in the Prada and Miu Miu shows during Milan Fashion Week. She became the first non-Caucasian model since Naomi Campbell in 1997 to walk the show, and just the second female Asian model to walk for Prada. Prada is one of the most influential runway shows to book for an upcoming model. The Prada/Miu Miu bookings led to a flurry of bookings in Paris (Balenciaga, Chloe, Lanvin, Rochas).

Park has appeared on the catwalk for designers such as Christian Dior, Chanel, Louis Vuitton, Max Azria, Alexander McQueen, and Burberry. She has also collaborated with famous photographers like Steven Meisel, Mario Testino, Steven Klein, Annie Leibovitz, Patrick Demarchelier, Arthur Elgort, Craig McDean, David Sims, Mario Sorrenti, Ellen von Unwerth, Mikael Jannsen, Greg Kadel, Laurie Bartley, Nathaniel Goldberg, Terry Tsiolis, and many more. Her trademarks are mole just beneath her nose and her face bone structure.

Park has appeared in editorials for many magazines, including Vogue (American, French, Italian, Chinese and Korean editions), Flair, Numero, Allure, New York Times, Pop, Harper's Baazar, and others. She posed for international campaigns for Roberto Cavalli, Dolce & Gabbana, D&G, H&M, M.A.C. Cosmetics, GAP, Le Printemps, Marc Jacobs, Cesare Paciotti, Tiffany & Co, MaxMara, Saks Fifth Ave, Plastic Island and Love, Sex, Money.  She has also been the face of Korean brands H&T (Hangten) and KeraSys. She speaks English and Korean.

In 2011, during the 2011 Fall/Winter collections at Paris Fashion Week, Park became the first ethnic Asian to model for two French fashion brands, Balmain and Isabel Marant who are reputed for hiring Caucasians only.

Personal life
Park was born in Seoul, South Korea, but immigrated to Salt Lake City, Utah when she was a young teen.  She was discovered at an open casting call while attending the University of Utah in 2004.  As one of the few Asian models on the international high fashion scene, Park's debut in Fall 2005 was strong – Vogue magazine named her one of the top 10 models.  According to Xinhua News, Park's rise on the fashion scene – along with other East Asian supermodels Du Juan and Anne Watanabe – coincides with the renewed Western interest in Asia.

In June 2008, she married her boyfriend of three years.

References

External links

 Hye-rim Park Profile
 Hye Park's profile on The Internet Fashion Database

1985 births
Living people
American female models
American models of Korean descent
American people of South Korean descent
American people of Korean descent
People from Seoul
South Korean female models
University of Utah alumni
Models from Seoul
21st-century American women